Margaret Hageman Sedenquist (January 17, 1927 – February 9, 2021) was an American businesswoman and entrepreneur.

Early life and education
Sedenquist was born on January 17, 1927, and grew up on a cattle ranch in Douglas, Wyoming. She received a bachelor's degree in psychology from the University of Wyoming. She then moved Westward with a pioneer spirit that ultimately led to her career as one of the first powerful businesswomen in corporate California.

Career
Sedenquist was president of Mohawk Management Corporation in Pasadena, California, and the former president of Sedenquist-Fraser Enterprises, Inc., which owned and operated a plastics factory. Sedenquist co-founded Commercial Pacific Bank in Santa Cruz, California, and served as board chair. She had served on the board of trustees on University of La Verne since 2010.

She worked with employees at General Electric to develop a revolutionary corporate communication system. She was a psychologist for the GE company and was the youngest, and only, woman. Because of her trustworthy and hard work, she spent a lot of time on the factory floor.

Under Sedenquist's leadership as board president, the Pasadena Playhouse (State Theatre of California), re-opened in 1986. The theatre, which first opened in 1925, had been closed since 1969. Sedenquist also served as Board Chair of Five Acres, a child and family services agency in Altadena, California. She served as Board President of the Pasadena Pops Orchestra, and she was founding Board Chair of the Pasadena Chamber Orchestra. Sedenquist also served on the board of the Pasadena YWCA, the Institute for Religion and Wholeness at the Claremont School of Theology, and the Arcadia Methodist Hospital Foundation. She served on the City of Pasadena's Finance Committee, the Endowment Advisory Committee, and as chair of the City Hall Restoration Finance Committee.

Real estate developer and broker
In her capacity as a real estate developer and broker, Sedenquist served as president of the Pasadena Association of Realtors, the Society of Exchange Counselors, and the Los Angeles County Boards of Real Estate. She served on the board of directors of the California Association of Realtors. She was the founder of the Foothill Apartment Association, a trade organization for property owners and managers. The Pasadena Foothills Association of Realtors gave Margaret the 2018 Distinguished Service Award for her work with organizations such as the Pasadena Playhouse and Five Acres.

The Women's Civic League named Sedenquist as the Woman of the Year in 2011. From 2016, she served as the co-chair of the Scoreboard Task Force, a research committee affiliated with the City of Hope’s Center for Cancer and Aging, 
and composed of cancer survivors who provide information and feedback to a national group of oncologists working to develop new and improved patient care protocols for older patients with cancer. The University of La Verne endowed a scholarship in her name shortly after her death.

Personal life
Sedenquist has three children, two sons named Mark and Daniel, and a daughter named Diana. 

She died from COVID-19 on February 9, 2021, at the age of 94.

Notes

External links 
University of La Verne trustee bios
Pasadena POPS
YWCA site
SEC Board of governors
Pasadena Star-News obituary

American women in business
2021 deaths
1927 births
People from Douglas, Wyoming
People from Pasadena, California
Deaths from the COVID-19 pandemic in California